Khushiar or Khvoshyar or Khowshyar may refer to:
 Khvoshyar, Kermanshah